The  Sarwate Inter-state bus terminus popularly known as Sarwate Bus Stand or ISBT, located in Indore is the oldest and one of the biggest Inter State Bus Terminals in Indore. It operates bus services between Indore (Madhya Pradesh) and 5 other states, Rajasthan, Gujarat, Uttar Pradesh, Maharashtra and Chhattisgarh. Spread over an area of about 1 acre, it handles over 1800 buses a day.

History
Sarwate Bus Stand was opened in 1961

Facilities
The departure block, waiting area and food court are centrally air conditioned. Reverse Osmosis plants have been installed to supply clean drinking water to the passengers. high speed, secured Wi-Fi zone allows passengers to remain connected. To keep the building environment friendly a sewage treatment plant has been installed with the capacity of 1000 cubic meter per day. The sewage water is treated and recycled to be used in the air-conditioning plant and for the purpose of horticulture and flushing of toilets. A new parking management system has also been developed which is capable of storing data of buses entering and exiting the premises. high resolution CCTV cameras have also been installed for surveillance.

Developments
The redevelopment of the bus stand was completed in the first quarter of 2022, and inaugurated by CM Shivraj Singh Chauhan on 22nd March 2022.

References

See also
 City portal at Govt. of India info. website
 
 

Bus stations in Madhya Pradesh
1961 establishments in Madhya Pradesh
Transport infrastructure completed in 1961